Confessions of a Police Captain  (also known as Confessions of a Police Commissioner to the District Attorney) is an Italian crime-drama film.

The film won the Golden Prize at the 7th Moscow International Film Festival in 1971 and the Prix lntemational de l'Academie du Cinema at the Étoile de Cristal Awards in 1972.

Plot
Police Captain Bonavia (Balsam) arranges the release of a criminally insane prisoner, Michele Lipuma, who immediately sets about settling a score with a local construction magnate, Ferdinando Dubrosio. As Bonavia follows Lipuma's initial movements, it becomes clear that Bonavia orchestrated his release for that outcome. Lipuma's attempt to kill Dubrosio fails—Dubrosio was tipped off somehow and left three gunmen in his place...all of whom, including Lipuma, end up dead.
D.A. Traini (Nero), energetic and idealistic, takes over the case and is informed by Bonavia of the stranglehold Dubrosio has over the local construction industry, and how he and various government officials game the system for their own benefit.  As the case unfolds, Traini realizes that Bonavia masterminded the events as intricately as any criminal, and vows to bring him down. Traini believes whole-heartedly in the system and its officials, refusing to accept corruption of any official, but is countered by Bonavia, who explains that all he has to do to derail Traini is muddy the water with slander.

Central to the overall case is the whereabouts of Lipuma's sister, Serena, who was once involved with Dubrosio and privy to many of the conversations held between Dubrosio and the government officials. As witnesses to Dubrosio's activities tend to disappear, when Bonavia finds Serena, he puts her in a safe house known only to himself. Traini finally decides to start the prosecution of Bonavia, prompting Bonavia to write a full confession, including the murder of Dubrosio, which he then commits while Traini is reading the confession.  Bonavia immediately turns himself in, and when the arrest is mentioned on TV, Serena calls the courthouse to enquire...only to have Dubrosio's thugs arrive at the safe house, claiming to be sent by the court. She is unceremoniously killed, encased in a concrete, and incorporated into a local construction project.

From prison, Bonavia questions whether Traini will investigate how Dubrosio found out where Serena was hidden...as it was only after she contacted the courthouse...but Traini refuses to consider any possible collusion between parties. He reassures Bonavia that the system has integrity and will serve justice in the end. Bonavia responds that prison is a different world, and one where Traini holds no influence. Bonavia is duly killed in prison, eliminating the last 'loose thread'. With that, Traini realizes that the word could only have come from the Attorney-General himself, who smugly smiles and asks "Is something wrong?" when finally confronted.

Cast 
 Franco Nero: Deputy D.A. Traini
 Martin Balsam: Commissioner Bonavia
 Marilù Tolo: Serena Li Puma
 Claudio Gora: District Attorney Malta
 Luciano Catenacci: Ferdinando Lomunno
 Giancarlo Prete: Giampaolo Rizzo
 Arturo Dominici: Lawyer Canistraro
 Michele Gammino: Gammino
 Adolfo Lastretti: Michele Li Puma
 Nello Pazzafini: prisoner

Releases
Wild East released this on a limited edition R0 NTSC DVD alongside The Summertime Killer in 2010.

References

External links

1971 films
1971 crime drama films
Italian crime drama films
1970s Italian-language films
Films about the Sicilian Mafia
1970s political thriller films
Films directed by Damiano Damiani
Films set in Sicily
Films scored by Riz Ortolani
1970s Italian films